Nitro is a Mexican professional wrestler active as a rudo in Consejo Mundial de Lucha Libre. Currently he is in a stable call Los Guerreros Tuareg. Nitro's real name is not a matter of public record, as is often the case with masked wrestlers in Mexico where their private lives are kept a secret from the wrestling fans.

Professional wrestling career

Consejo Mundial de Lucha Libre
In early 1992, Nitro joined CMLL under the gimmick of Filiso as a tecnico who was on the undercard. By 1996, Filiso participated in a tournament for entry into the Torneo Gran Alternativa, but failed to qualify. He did not find much success for many years in CMLL, until he was reintroduced as Nitro in 2002. When re-debuting he joined Pierroth's evolving Los Boricua stable. On July 14, 2002, Nitro teamed with Doctor X and Virus to defeat Super Muñeco, Super Raton, and Super Pinocchio. Later on in 2005, he joined the Pandilla Guerrera group, also including Sangre Azteca and Doctor X. The trio eventually won the Mexican National Trios Championship on March 25, 2005, defeating Safari, El Felino, and Volador Jr. After winning the trios titles, Nitro participated in the Torneo Gran Alternativa teaming with Pierroth. In the quarter finals, Pierroth and Nitro lost to Dr. Wagner, Jr. and Misterioso, Jr. On October 10, 2005, Nitro and his team lost the trios championship to El Sagrado, El Texano, Jr., and Máximo. In 2006, Nitro participated in the Torneo Gran Alternativa, this time teaming with Último Guerrero. In the quarter finals, the duo defeated Dos Caras, Jr. and Volador Jr., and in the semi-finals they defeated Rey Bucanero and Loco Max. In the final, they lost to Perro Aguayo, Jr. and Misterioso, Jr. At this time CMLL and IWRG had an agreement on exchanging wrestlers, and Nitro began wrestling in IWRG. On October 1, 2006, he won the IWRG Intercontinental Middleweight Championship defeating El Pantera. His reign as champion was short-lived, as he lost the championship to Pentagon Black on October 15, 2006. In 2008, Nitro created a new group called Los Guerreros Tuareg. He teamed with Skandalo to participate in a CMLL Arena Coliseo Tag Team Title Tournament in mid-2008. In the first round the duo won by defeating Sensei and Neutron. In the next round they lost to Flash and Stuka, Jr. In early 2009, Nitro was injured and underwent double knee surgery, resulting in an eight-month hiatus. Nitro kept teaming with his Guerreros Tuareg teammates. Nitro suffered a broken kneecap during a match on August 15, 2012. In a later interview Nitro stated that he was hoping to return November 15, 2012.

Championship and accomplishment
Consejo Mundial de Lucha Libre
Mexican National Trios Championship (1 time) – with Doctor X and Sangre Azteca
International Wrestling Revolution Group
IWRG Intercontinental Middleweight Championship (1 time)

Luchas de Apuestas record

Notes

References

1966 births
Living people
Masked wrestlers
Mexican male professional wrestlers
Professional wrestlers from Mexico City
Unidentified wrestlers
20th-century professional wrestlers
21st-century professional wrestlers
Mexican National Trios Champions